FK Kosonsoy is Uzbekistani football club based in Kosonsoy, Namangan Province. Currently it plays in Uzbekistan First League

History
FK Kosonsoy played in first Oliy League season in 1992 under name Kosonsoychi Kosonsoy. The club changed its name several times. Kosonsoy completed 5 seasons in top league of uzbek football. The last season club played in Uzbek League is 1998. In 2013 club played in Uzbekistan First League, Zone "East".

Name changes history
 1992: Kosonsoychi Kosonsoy
 1993: Kosonsoychi
 1994: Kosonsoychi
 1995: Kosonsoychi
 1996–2012: FK Kosonsoy
 2013: FK Kosonsoy ZK
 2014: KOSONSOY 
 2015: FC KOSONSOY
 2016: KOSONSOY

References

External links
 FK Kosonsoy matches and results at soccervista.com
 FK Kosonsoy matches and results at soccerway.com

Football clubs in Uzbekistan